William Frederic Lawrence (29 December 1844 – 15 January 1935) was a British politician. He was a Conservative Member of Parliament (MP) from 1885 to 1906.

He was the eldest son of the Rev. Charles Washington Lawrence of Liverpool. He went to Eton College, and received a B.A. from Christ Church, Oxford in 1867 and an M.A. in 1872.  He began the study of law at Lincoln's Inn in 1867 and was called to the bar in 1871.  He was a Justice of the Peace of Wiltshire.

Lawrence was first elected to Parliament in the 1885 general election for the new constituency of Liverpool Abercromby. He held the seat in the next four general elections.  In the 1906 general election, he lost the seat by 199 votes to the Liberal candidate J. E. B. Seely. He died in Salisbury aged 90.

References

External links 
 
 
 

1844 births
1935 deaths
People educated at Eton College
Alumni of Christ Church, Oxford
Conservative Party (UK) MPs for English constituencies
UK MPs 1885–1886
UK MPs 1886–1892
UK MPs 1892–1895
UK MPs 1895–1900
UK MPs 1900–1906